Motomachi Station (元町駅) is a Sapporo Municipal Subway in Higashi-ku, Sapporo, Hokkaido, Japan. The station number is H03.

Platforms

Surrounding area
 Higashi-Motomachi Police Station
 Sapporo Higashi Post Office
 Tsuruha drug store, Motomachi-Kita branch
 Maxvalu Supermarket, Kita-26 branch
 Sapporo shinkin Bank, Motomachi branch
 Rumoi shinkin Bank, Sapporo branch
 North Pacific Bank, Motomachi branch
 Muroran shinkin Bank, Sapporo-Higashi branch
 Hokuriku Bank, Motomachi Kugin Plaza
 Hokkaido shinkin Bank, Sapporo-Kita branch

External links

 Sapporo Subway Stations

Railway stations in Japan opened in 1988
Railway stations in Sapporo
Sapporo Municipal Subway
Higashi-ku, Sapporo